Filetia is a genus of flowering plants in the acanthus family (Acanthaceae), found in west Malesia (Sundaland). It is named for Dutch Army physician G.J. Filet, 1825–1891.

Species
Species currently accepted by The Plant List are as follows: 
Filetia bracteosa C.B.Clarke
Filetia brookeae Bremek.
Filetia costulata Miq.
Filetia glabra Ridl.
Filetia hirta Ridl.
Filetia lanceolata Bremek.
Filetia paniculata C.B.Clarke
Filetia ridleyi C.B.Clarke
Filetia scortechinii C.B.Clarke

References

Acanthaceae
Acanthaceae genera